George H. Walker (October 22, 1811September 20, 1866) was an American trader and politician, and was one of three key founders of the city of Milwaukee, Wisconsin. He served as the 5th and 7th Mayor of Milwaukee, and represented Milwaukee in the Wisconsin State Assembly and its predecessor body in the Wisconsin Territory.

His younger brother, Isaac P. Walker, was one of the first two men elected to the United States Senate from Wisconsin.

Background
Walker was born in Lynchburg, Virginia, and moved with his family to Illinois in 1825.  The fur trade brought him to the vicinity of the Milwaukee River in 1833, and, on March 20, 1834, he established himself on the south bank of the river.  In June 1835, he founded the settlement of Walker's Point and established a fur trading post. In 1846, Walker's settlement combined with two rival villages - Solomon Juneau's Juneautown (present-day East Town) and Byron Kilbourn's Kilbourntown (present-day Westown) - to incorporate the City of Milwaukee.

Land that belonged to Walker is now part of the Walker's Point Historic District, listed on the National Register of Historic Places.

Public office 
In 1835, those parts of Michigan Territory who were not set to become part of the new State of Michigan were invited to elect members to a seventh and last Michigan Territorial Council (the so-called "Rump Council"). Walker was elected from Milwaukee County, but was one of the four (out of thirteen) who did not attend the "Rump Council" when it met (briefly) in January 1836.

Walker served in the first three sessions of the 4th Legislative Assembly of the Wisconsin Territory, serving from 1842 to 1845, and was speaker for the 2nd and 3rd sessions.  He was elected to the Wisconsin State Assembly in 1850, serving in the 3rd Wisconsin Legislature. Walker also served as the city's supervisor, register of the land office, alderman, and as mayor in 1851 and 1853. He was one of the builders of the city's first street car line in 1859, and was invested in the Milwaukee and Mississippi Railroad, the Milwaukee and Watertown Railroad, and the La Crosse and Milwaukee Railroad.

Electoral history

| colspan="6" style="text-align:center;background-color: #e9e9e9;"| General Election

Family life
Walker's younger brother, Isaac P. Walker, was a U.S. Senator from Wisconsin, serving from 1848 to 1855.

He died on September 20, 1866, and is buried at Forest Home Cemetery in Milwaukee.

References

Further reading
 "Jovial George Walker". (Mar. 15, 1934). Milwaukee Journal.

External links
 
 George H. Walker portrait at Wisconsin Historical Society
 

|-

1811 births
1866 deaths
Members of the Wisconsin Territorial Legislature
Members of the Wisconsin State Assembly
Milwaukee Common Council members
Mayors of Milwaukee
People from Illinois
Politicians from Lynchburg, Virginia
American city founders
19th-century American politicians
19th-century American businesspeople